The Scotts Peak Dam is a rockfill embankment dam without a spillway across the Huon River, located in the South West region of Tasmania, Australia.

The impounded reservoir, also formed with the Edgar Dam and the Serpentine Dam, is called Lake Pedder which flooded Lake Edgar, a naturally forming fault scarp pond. The dam was constructed in 1973 by the Hydro Electric Corporation (TAS) as part of the Gordon River Power Development Scheme for the purpose of generating hydro-electric power via the conventional Gordon Power Station. Water from Lake Pedder is diverted to Lake Gordon (formed by the Gordon Dam) via the McPartlan Pass Canal.

Location and features
The Scotts Peak Dam, together with the Edgar Dam and the Serpentine Dam, are three major dams that form the headwaters for the Gordon River Power Development Scheme. The dam is located near Lake Pedder's most easterly point in the upper reaches of the Huon River where the river descends from the Marsden Range and descends into what is now known as the Huon Basin. Also at the southern end of the Lake Pedder, the Scotts Peak Dam impounds the upper reaches of the Huon River. At the northwestern end of the lake is impounded by the Serpentine Dam across the Serpentine River. The water in Lake Pedder provides around 40% of the water used in the Gordon Power Station. The water flows to Lake Gordon via McPartlan Canal. Water from Lake Gordon then exits through the Gordon Dam.

At 100% capacity the dam wall holds back  of water. The dam wall does not have a spillway.

In 2001 the dam was recorded as an Historic Engineering Marker along with twenty-four other dams by Engineers Australia.

Controversy
The construction of Scotts Peak Dam was controversial as it was built to flood Lake Pedder and extend the reservoir for the Gordon Dam. A small greens movement was formed it response, which mobilised in the 1980s to stop the proposed Franklin River Dam.

Problems 
In the 2008 edition of Ticklebelly Tales engineers associated with the dam acknowledge that there were issues leaks as soon as it was built.
Evidence of deformation is still current in the 2010s.

Climate

This site is frequently lashed by severe weather; cloud cover is likewise extreme.

See also

 List of dams in Tasmania

References

Hydro Tasmania dams
Lake Pedder
Dams completed in 1973
Rock-filled dams
Embankment dams
Gordon River power development scheme
Recipients of Engineers Australia engineering heritage markers